Rostislav Čtvrtlík (9 November 1963 – 6 March 2011) was a Czech stage, television and voice actor. He was the Czech voice of Matthew Perry in Friends and other TV shows and movies.

Biography 
Čtvrtlík was born in Olomouc in 1963. He attended school in Lipník nad Bečvou before moving to Prague, where he studied acting at the Faculty of Theatre. Čtvrtlík started working at the Divadlo pod Palmovkou in 1992, and continued his association with the theatre until his death. His role as Lennie in the play Of Mice and Men at Divadlo pod Palmovka was among Čtvrtlík's most known roles, as the play was performed over 300 times. As a voice actor, Čtvrtlík dubbed the voice of Matthew Perry's character Chandler Bing in the American television sitcom Friends. Čtvrtlík died in March 2011 after a 12-year illness.

Filmography 
"Kriminálka Anděl" (2008) (TV series) ...  (episode ???)
"Škola Na Výsluní" (2006) (TV series) ... teacher
Zlá minuta (2005) (TV) ... 
Otec neznámý (2001) (TV) ... 
"Četnické humoresky" (1997) (TV series) ...
"Motel Anathema" (1997) (TV series) ... 
Úsvit (1997) ... 
"Kde padají hvězdy" (1996) (TV series) ...  (episode)
Případ černých vzadu (1992) (TV) ... 
Černá Fortuna (1991) (TV) ... 
Přílíš mnoho dobrých úmyslů (1991) (TV) ... 
"Rodáci" (1988) (TV series) ...

Theatre 
Full member of Divadlo Pod Palmovkou since 1992.
Hamlet ... Leartes
Sicilská tradice ... Tralala (Pirandello) 
Kouzelník z Lublin ... Jaša
Vojcek ... Vojcek
Life is a Dream ... Astolfo
Amadeus ... Josef II.
Výstřely na Broadwayi ... Cheech (Woody Allen)
Konkurenti ... Dave Moss (David Mamet)
Of Mice and Men ... Lennie
Ubohý vrah|Poky Killer ... Third actor (Pavel Kohout)
Caligula ... Cherea
Oidipus ruler ... Kreon
Ještě jednou, profesore ... Ota (Antonín Procházka)
The Tempest ... Caliban, Savage, Slave (William Shakespeare)
Gazdina roba ... Samko Jagoš (Gabriela Preissová)
Sliby chyby ... Doctor Dreyfus (Neil Simon, Burt Bacharach, Hal David)
Viva La Queen... John Knox (R. Bolt)
One Flew Over the Cuckoo's Nest ... Chief Bromdem
Pozor, jaguar ... Brad (Nathaniel Richard Nash)
Nájemnící pana Swana ... Dr. Chapman (Michael Cooney)

References

External links 

Website Theatre Pod Palmovkou

1963 births
2011 deaths
Czech male television actors
Czech male stage actors
Czech male voice actors
Actors from Olomouc
Czechoslovak male actors